Nikos Anastasiadis (born 16 July 1966) is a Greek skier. He competed at the 1988 Winter Olympics, the 1992 Winter Olympics and the 1994 Winter Olympics.

References

External links
 

1966 births
Living people
Greek male biathletes
Greek male cross-country skiers
Olympic biathletes of Greece
Olympic cross-country skiers of Greece
Biathletes at the 1992 Winter Olympics
Cross-country skiers at the 1988 Winter Olympics
Cross-country skiers at the 1992 Winter Olympics
Cross-country skiers at the 1994 Winter Olympics
Sportspeople from Naousa, Imathia